Acropustulosis refers to acrodermatitis with pustular involvement.

Types include:
 Pustulosis palmaris et plantaris
 Infantile acropustulosis

References

External links 

Dermatologic terminology